The United Kingdom local elections took place on 1 May 1997. Elections took place for all of the English country councils, some English unitary authorities and all of the Northern Ireland districts.  The elections were held on the same day as the general election.

Summary of results

While the results were overshadowed by the landslide election of a Labour government, they did provide some comfort to the Conservative party. The Conservatives made some gains and were the largest party in the county council elections. 
It is likely that what helped the Conservatives gain some councils (Cambridgeshire, Bedfordshire, Essex and Kent) was the creation of unitary authorities and thus the abolition of county council divisions in these areas (in this case unitaries in Peterborough, Luton, Thurrock and Medway), in predominantly urbanised areas which are usually strong for the Labour Party in elections and indeed all four of those unitaries (and all of the parliamentary seats that they cover) were won/held by Labour at the point these elections took place. Buckinghamshire, the only county council that the Conservatives actually had a majority for the four years prior to these elections, will have also been helped by the creation of a unitary authority for Milton Keynes in 1996.

The gains for the Conservatives in Lincolnshire, Surrey and West Sussex will likely have been helped by the fact that most parliamentary seats in these counties were seriously strong Conservative areas (indeed, every parliamentary seat in Surrey was retained by the Conservatives in the general election) and thus saw some genuine ground recovered compared with the 1993 local elections. The only seats that the Conservatives lost in the general election in these areas were Lincoln and Crawley, both of which were very easy seats for Labour to gain in the general election, while they came close to losing Boston & Skegness to Labour too, though this was far from enough to have made a difference to council control in their respective counties.

England

Non-metropolitan county councils
In 34 non-metropolitan counties the whole council was up for election.

† Elected as a "shadow authority" until 1 April 1998.

‡ Because areas of the county were due to become unitary authorities on 1 April 1998, the county councillors representing those areas had their terms extended by one year and no election was held.

Unitary authorities

Whole council
These were the first elections to 19 more unitary authorities established by the Local Government Commission for England (1992). They acted as "shadow authorities" until 1 April 1998.

‡ New ward boundaries from predecessor authorities

Third of council
In 2 unitary authorities one third of the council was up for election.

District council
In 1 district the whole council was up for election.

‡ New ward boundaries

Sui generis

Northern Ireland

References

Local election results 1997
The local elections of 1 May 1997. House of Commons Library Research Paper 97/82.
Vote 1999 BBC News
Vote 2001 BBC News

 
1997
Local elections